The 10th Mieczysław Połukard Criterium of Polish Speedway League Aces was the 1991 version of the Mieczysław Połukard Criterium of Polish Speedway Leagues Aces. It took place on March 24 in the Polonia Stadium in Bydgoszcz, Poland.

Starting positions draw 

 Mirosław Kowalik - Apator Toruń
 Mirosław Korbel - ROW Rybnik
 Jacek Woźniak - Polonia Bydgoszcz
 Jarosław Olszewski - Wybrzeże Gdańsk
 Tomasz Gollob - Polonia Bydgoszcz
 Jacek Gomólski - Start Gniezno
 Dariusz Śledź - Motor Lublin
 Zenon Kasprzak - Unia Leszno
 Jan Krzystyniak - Stal-Westa Rzeszów
 Sławomir Drabik - Włókniarz Częstochowa
 Ryszard Dołomisiewicz - Polonia Bydgoszcz
 Roman Jankowski - Unia Leszno
 Jacek Krzyżaniak - Apator Toruń
 Wojciech Zaluski - Kolejarz-Remak Opole
 Andrzej Huszcza - Morawski Zielona Góra
 Jacek Gollob - Polonia Bydgoszcz
 (R1) Leszek Sokołowski - Polonia Bydgoszcz
 (R2) Tomasz Kornacki - Polonia Bydgoszcz

Heat details

Sources 
 Roman Lach - Polish Speedway Almanac

See also 

Mieczyslaw Polukard
Mieczyslaw Polukard
Mieczysław Połukard Criterium of Polish Speedway Leagues Aces